Billy Uhl (born April 22, 1950) is an American former professional motorcycle enduro competitor. He represented the United States in the International Six Day Trials in the 1970s, winning five gold medals.

The son of a motorcycle dealer, he was born in Wooster, Ohio and grew up in Idaho. Uhl competed in several different off-road motorcycling disciplines including motocross, trials, dirt track oval racing and hillclimbs. In 1969, Uhl became the youngest ISDT gold medal winner at the age of nineteen. After his retirement from competition, he became active in designing off-road trails as well as becoming an advocate for responsible off-road vehicle usage.

He was inducted into the AMA Motorcycle Hall of Fame in 2007.

References

External links
Billy Uhl at the AMA Motorcycle Hall of Fame

American motorcycle racers
Enduro riders
People from Wooster, Ohio
Sportspeople from Boise, Idaho
1950 births
Living people